Potterhanworth Booths is a hamlet in the  North Kesteven district of Lincolnshire, England.
 
The hamlet has a population of about 30, and is within the civil parish of Potterhanworth. It is adjacent to Potterhanworth Fen to the south-east.

Potterhanworth Booths takes its name from the village of Potterhanworth,  to the south-west, whose name refers to the early clay industries set up in the local area.

History

Bronze Age round barrows and spear heads have been found in the village, and there are signs that Potterhanworth Booths was farmed during the Iron Age.

Potterhanworth Booths and Branston Booths were both settled by the Romans. At Potterhanworth Booths, remains of Roman field boundaries and enclosures, as well as worked iron, a quern, millstones and coins have been found.

References

Hamlets in Lincolnshire
North Kesteven District